The following is a list of notable decisions by the Supreme Court of Canada sorted by author.

Understanding what cases were authored by whom can be important.  For example, in early interpretation of the Canadian Charter of Rights and Freedoms, it has been said there was much agreement.  However, in the third year of this interpretation the judges of the Supreme Court "each had started to develop their own method of reasoning."

List
Decisions of the Court:
 By the Court decisions of the Supreme Court of Canada
Current justices:
 Reasons of the Supreme Court of Canada by Chief Justice Wagner
 Reasons of the Supreme Court of Canada by Justice Abella
 Reasons of the Supreme Court of Canada by Justice Cromwell
 Reasons of the Supreme Court of Canada by Justice Moldaver
 Reasons of the Supreme Court of Canada by Justice Karakatsanis
 Reasons of the Supreme Court of Canada by Justice Gascon
 Reasons of the Supreme Court of Canada by Justice Côté
 Reasons of the Supreme Court of Canada by Justice Rowe
 Reasons of the Supreme Court of Canada by Justice Martin

Past justices:
 Reasons of the Supreme Court of Canada by Chief Justice Lamer
 Reasons of the Supreme Court of Canada by Chief Justice McLachlin 
 Reasons of the Supreme Court of Canada by Justice L'Heureux-Dubé
 Reasons of the Supreme Court of Canada by Justice Gonthier
 Reasons of the Supreme Court of Canada by Justice Iacobucci
 Reasons of the Supreme Court of Canada by Justice Major
 Reasons of the Supreme Court of Canada by Justice Arbour
 Reasons of the Supreme Court of Canada by Justice Bastarache
 Reasons of the Supreme Court of Canada by Justice Charron
 Reasons of the Supreme Court of Canada by Justice Binnie
 Reasons of the Supreme Court of Canada by Justice LeBel
 Reasons of the Supreme Court of Canada by Justice Deschamps
 Reasons of the Supreme Court of Canada by Justice Fish
 Reasons of the Supreme Court of Canada by Justice Rothstein
 Reasons of the Supreme Court of Canada by Justice Sopinka

Decisions by Dickson

Majority
 Solosky v. The Queen, [1980]
 Hunter v. Southam Inc., 1984
 R. v. Therens, 1985
 R. v. Big M Drug Mart Ltd., 1985
 R. v. Oakes, 1986
 Beauregard v. Canada, 1986
 R. v. Edwards Books and Art Ltd., 1986
 R. v. Morgentaler, 1988
 General Motors of Canada Ltd. v. City National Leasing, 1989
 Brooks v. Canada Safeway Ltd., 1989
 R. v. Sparrow, 1990 (with La Forest J)
 R. v. Keegstra, 1990
 Mahe v. Alberta, 1990

Decisions by La Forest

Majority
 Canada v. Schmidt, [1987] 1 S.C.R. 500
 United States of America v. Cotroni; United States of America v. El Zein, [1989] 1 S.C.R. 1469
 R. v. Sparrow, [1990] 1. S.C.R. 1075 (with Dickson)
 McKinney v. University of Guelph, [1990] 3 S.C.R. 229
 Douglas/Kwantlen Faculty Assn. v. Douglas College, [1990] 3 S.C.R. 570
 Morguard Investments Ltd. v. De Savoye, [1990] 3 S.C.R. 1077
 Eldridge v. British Columbia (Attorney General), [1997] 2 S.C.R. 624

References

Author

 
Supreme